Taşkesen may refer to:

 Taşkesen, Devrek
 Taşkesen, Bayburt
 Taşkesen, Keban